Nurneysville is an unincorporated community in the independent city of Suffolk, Virginia, United States.

References

Suffolk, Virginia communities